The 1980–81 Rotary Watches National Basketball League season was the ninth season of the National Basketball League.

The league was sponsored by Rotary Watches for the third consecutive year and Birmingham Team Fiat broke the Crystal Palace monopoly by taking the league title. Sunderland provided a major shock when securing the Play Offs title. Palace, who were expected to make a clean sweep of silverware, gained some consolation by winning the National Cup.

Team changes
Coventry Team Fiat were rebranded Birmingham and moved to a larger venue at the Aston Villa Leisure Centre which served as a catalyst for their success. Manchester took on the name Trafford for the season but apart from this the teams remained the same. A team called Solent Stars backed by a millionaire businessman called Harry Smith  easily won the second division and competed successfully against first division teams in tournaments.

National League

First Division

Second Division

Rotary Watches playoffs

Semi-finals

Final

Asda National Cup

First round

Quarter-finals

Semi-finals

Final

References

See also
Basketball in England
British Basketball League
English Basketball League
List of English National Basketball League seasons

National Basketball League (England) seasons
 
British